Tuanku Zara Salim (née Zara Salim Davidson; born 22 March 1973) is married to Sultan Nazrin Muizzuddin Shah, who is the reigning Sultan of Perak. She has been conferred the title of Raja Permaisuri (Queen consort) of Perak by the Dewan Negara Perak on 20 June 2014.

A chemical engineer by training, she was heading an oil and gas consultancy firm based in Kuala Lumpur before her marriage to the Sultan. She and the Sultan, who had been the country's most eligible royal bachelor for decades, have known each other since the mid-1990s. She was officially crowned as the Raja Permaisuri of Perak during Sultan Nazrin's enthronement ceremony as the 35th Sultan of Perak on 6 May 2015.

Early life
Born in the city of Ipoh on 22 March 1973, she is the youngest of four children of William Stanley Walker Davidson (Salim Davidson), an Englishman and his ethnic Malay wife of mixed Arab and Thai descent, Sharifah Azaliah binti Syed Omar Shahabudin who is from Alor Setar, Kedah. She is also a distant member of Kedah Royal Family on her maternal side and has three elder brothers. Her father is a prominent lawyer in Perak and Kuala Lumpur.

Zara, who has a strong interest in foreign languages, studied at SMK Convent Ipoh and represented her school in squash and tennis from 1988 to 1990. She also represented Perak in swimming between 1981 and 1987.

After completing her A-Levels at Prime College in 1992, she left for the United Kingdom to study chemical engineering at the University of Nottingham and graduated with first class honours in July 1995. She also won the top student award for her final-year project.

Coincidentally her father-in-law, the late Sultan Azlan Shah, read law at the same university and was conferred the Bachelor of Laws degree in 1953 before being admitted to the English Bar in 1954.

Career
Zara joined the Business Evaluation Department in the Corporate Planning Unit of Petronas in December 1995 and was part of the team responsible for the successful establishment of the Kertih and Kuantan integrated petrochemical complexes, whose foreign partners included BP, BASF, Dow Chemicals and Mitsubishi.

She then became a project analyst in the Petronas Petrochemical Business Unit and was part of the core team developing the Petronas brand essence, which now forms part of the Petronas global branding strategy.

Between February 1999 and October 2000, she was a product manager at Petlin (Malaysia) Sdn Bhd, a Petronas joint venture with DSM of the Netherlands and Sasol of South Africa. She was also part of the Petronas project team to operationalise the largest single-train low-density polyethylene (LDPE) plant in the world at Kertih.

Zara left Petronas in November 2001 to become an account manager at Formis Network Services Sdn Bhd and then assumed the post of vice-president of partnerships and alliances at Formis (Malaysia) Berhad, a technology-based company listed on Bursa Malaysia, between 2003 and 2005.

Between 2005 and 2007, Zara, who is a certified life-saver and adventure sports enthusiast, became the managing director of Forthwave Consulting Sdn Bhd, a hydrocarbon technical engineering and software development company in Kuala Lumpur.

Royal connections
Zara Salim Davidson is the great-grandchild of Kedah's 24th ruler Sultan Abdul Hamid Halim Shah, Utusan Malaysia reported.

The Sultan ruled Kedah for 62 years from 1881 to 1943 and one of the Sultan's sons was Tunku Abdul Rahman, Malaysia's first prime minister. Therefore, she is also the grandniece of the Tunku and a niece of Sultan Abdul Halim Mu'adzam Shah and of the current sultan, Sultan Sallehuddin.

According to Zara's uncle Syed Mohd Aldinuri Syed Omar, Zara's mother Sharifah Azaliah Syed Omar was the daughter of Tunku Aminah, who was the daughter of Sultan Abdul Hamid and Che Manjalara.

From the marriage to Che Manjalara, Sultan Abdul Hamid had seven children, including Tunku Abdul Rahman Putra Al-Haj and Tunku Aminah.

Zara also has a close relationship with the late Sultan of Kedah, Sultan Abdul Halim Mu'adzam Shah Sultan Badlishah, who is the grandson of Sultan Abdul Hamid and a nephew to Tunku Abdul Rahman.

She is also the granddaughter of the former Kedah Menteri Besar Tan Sri Syed Omar Syed Abdullah Shahabudin. Tunku Aminah married Syed Omar, who became Kedah's second Menteri Besar after independence, from July 1959 to December 1967.

Marriage and children
Zara's wedding to Raja Nazrin Shah was held at Istana Iskandariah on 17 May 2007.

A day after the solemnisation of their vows, there was a special proclamation ceremony to bestow Zara with the official title of Raja Puan Besar of Perak, a title reserved for the royal wife of the Raja Muda (Crown Prince) of Perak that had been vacant since April 1987.

The royal wedding reception took place on 19 May 2007.

The couple's first child, a son named Raja Azlan Muzzaffar Shah, was born 14 March 2008. Their second child, a daughter named Raja Nazira Safya, was born 2 August 2011.

Current activities and social contributions
On July 9, 2007, a purple, hybrid orchid was named Dendrobium Tuanku Zara Salim in honour of her visit to the 7th Ipoh International Orchid Festival.

She is the current Chancellor of the Sultan Idris Education University (UPSI), and was proclaimed on 1 January 2012.

She has been awarded an Honorary Fellowship by the Institution of Chemical Engineers (IChemE) in April 2014 in recognition of her interest in the continued improvement of Malaysia's education and academic performance.

She then was made as the first Royal Patron of the IChemE in Malaysia in October 2016. On accepting the honour, Tuanku Zara said that chemical engineering can be a challenging career, but rewarding as well. Chemical engineers are highly employable, have wide and diverse career options, and can make a big impact in society and the environment. She intends to, as Royal Patron of the IChemE, do her part to inspire the younger generation to consider chemical engineering as a viable career choice.

She is also a patron of the Family Health Society of Perak, Convent Girls Alumni and Perak Girl Guides.

Honours
She has been awarded:

Honours of Perak
  Recipient of the Royal Family Order of Perak (DK) (6 May 2015).
  Superior Class of the Perak Family Order of Sultan Azlan Shah (18 May 2007)
  Member First Class of the Azlanii Royal Family Order

References

External links 
 Zara Salim Davidson will become Raja Puan Besar of Perak The Star, 11 May 2007.
 Zara is great-grandchild of Kedah's Sultan Abdul Hamid The Star, 11 May 2007.
 Ex-Nottingham U Top Student Zara Davidson To Wed Raja Muda Of Perak Bernama, 8 May 2007.
 Raja Muda Perak And Zara Tie The Knot Bernama, 17 May 2007.
 Tuanku Zara Is Raja Puan Besar Perak Bernama, 18 May 2007.
 Find Articles: Son for Raja Nazrin, Tunku Zara New Straits Times, 15 March 2008.
 Young prince makes the photographers day New Straits Times, 22 May 2012.
 ‘Confidence in legal system vital’ The Star, 23 May 2012.
 Lawasia: Lawyers – Dato’ William Stanley Walker Davidson Retrieved 30 January 2011.

|-

1973 births
People from Alor Setar
Living people
Alumni of the University of Nottingham
Chemical engineers
People from Kedah
Malaysian female swimmers
Malaysian people of English descent
Malaysian people of Arab descent
Malaysian people of Malay descent
Malaysian people of Thai descent
Malaysian Muslims
People from Ipoh
People from Perak
Royal House of Perak
Perak royal consorts
Royal House of Kedah